Serge Lepeltier (born 12 October 1953 in Le Veurdre, Allier) is a French politician.

He studied at HEC Paris.

He was mayor of Bourges in 1995 and again in 2001. He was elected senator of the Cher département on 27 September 1998.

He won the municipal elections in Bourges in 1995 over the communist candidate.

He briefly acted as President of the Rally for the Republic in 2002 after Michèle Alliot-Marie was nominated as Minister of Defence, and just before the Party was officially dissolved within the Union for a Popular Movement.

On 31 March 2004, Jean-Pierre Raffarin's government announced a reshuffle because of the massive losses in the French regional elections. Serge Lepeltier became Minister of the Environment, while Roselyne Bachelot-Narquin was dismissed.

In 2005 Serge Lepeltier joined the Radical Party.

References 

1953 births
Living people
People from Allier
Union of Democrats for the Republic politicians
Rally for the Republic politicians
Union for a Popular Movement politicians
Radical Party (France) politicians
Politicians of the French Fifth Republic
Mayors of places in Centre-Val de Loire
Politicians from Bourges
HEC Paris alumni
French Ministers of the Environment
Union of Democrats and Independents politicians
Senators of Cher (department)